The R936 road is a  long regional road in Ireland which links Ballyshannon with the N15 road in County Donegal.

See also 
 Roads in Ireland
 National primary road

References 

Regional roads in the Republic of Ireland
Roads in County Donegal